is a Japanese video game designer. A programming prodigy, Nakamura gained fame while still in high school; in 1982, he entered Enix's first national programming contest and claimed runner-up prize with his entry, Door Door. In 1984, he founded the video game company Chunsoft, where he remains its president.

Early game development
Nakamura was a member of the math club at Marugame High School in Kagawa Prefecture, Japan. There he wrote a version of the video game Galaxy Wars in the BASIC programming language on a Tandy TRS-80.

In order to play games such as Galaxian that were ported to the NEC PC-8001 by Geimu Kyoujin from I/O magazine, Nakamura bought a PC-8001 using money he'd saved up by delivering newspapers. It was on that PC-8001 that he developed his program submissions. He submitted a machine code input tool to I/O magazine, which was published in the February 1981 issue as his debut publication, earning him ¥20,000 for his work.

During spring break of his first year in high school, Nakamura cloned the arcade video game Space Panic as ALIEN Part II. It was published in the May 1981 issue and released on cassette tape, earning ¥200,000 in royalties. In the January 1982 issue, his clone of Konami's Scramble (later renamed to Attacker) was also released on cassette, earning royalties of  ¥1 million. A clone of River Patrol, called River Rescue, was published in the Maikon Game Book 4 special edition of I/O, bringing Nakamura's total high school earnings from submissions to I/O to over ¥2 million. Due to his activities with I/O, he became known among young PC enthusiasts.

Nakamura entered the first Annual Hobby Program Contest held by Enix during his 3rd year of high school in 1982. Submitting his first original game, Door Door, Nakamura was selected as the runner-up prize winner for programming excellence, and received ¥500,000 in prize money.

Career
In 1983, Nakamura moved to Tokyo and entered the University of Electro-Communications. Porting  Door Door to various computers, his annual royalties as a university student exceeded ¥10 million.

Nakamura released his 2nd PC game Newtron and founded the 5-person Chunsoft on April 9, 1984, during spring break of his 2nd year of university. He started to work out of a room in a condominium in Chōfu, Tokyo. The first Chunsoft release was the 1985 PC-6001 version of Door Door mkII. Following that, joining Enix on the Famicom, Chunsoft began development on home video game consoles. While the PC version had sold 80,000 copies, the Famicom version recorded sales of 200,000 copies, leading subsequent development to focus on home consoles. From that, fellow Enix program contest winner Yuji Horii joined Nakamura in collaborating on the Famicom port of The Portopia Serial Murder Case 

At the time, Nakamura and Horii were fans of the computer role-playing games Wizardry and Ultima, and so set out to develop a full-blown Famicom RPG called Dragon Quest. Prior to its release, Nakamura also cited Masanobu Endō, creator of action role-playing game The Tower of Druaga, as his favorite game designer. Nakamura continued development on the Dragon Quest series through to Dragon Quest V: Hand of the Heavenly Bride, before breaking away from Enix products.

Post-Enix
Otogirisō marked Chunsoft's debut brand. Following that, successive genre-trailblazing titles Torneko no Daibōken: Fushigi no Dungeon, Kamaitachi no Yoru, and Shiren the Wanderer established the company's good reputation. Nakamura himself had to move away from programming in order to run the company.

For a time, the company's products were considered mediocre, but 3-Nen B-Gumi Kinpachi Sensei: Densetsu no Kyoudan ni Tate! was a hit that showed signs of recovery.

SEGA×CHUN PROJECT
From 2005 to 2010, Chunsoft had tied up with Sega's home video game business, where Sega funded and published eight games with Chunsoft. In one of them, Nakamura served as producer for the Wii game 428: Shibuya Scramble.

Works

References

External links
Koichi Nakamura profile at MobyGames

1964 births
Japanese video game designers
Japanese video game directors
Living people